Hartley Bay Water Aerodrome  is located adjacent to Hartley Bay, British Columbia, Canada.

References

Seaplane bases in British Columbia
North Coast Regional District
Registered aerodromes in British Columbia